The American Society of Anesthesia Technologists & Technicians, or ASATT, based in Oak Creek, Wisconsin, is a non-profit, educational organization responsible for the standards of technologist/technician competency in all areas of anesthesia.

ASATT's mission is to establish a professional entity for the anesthesia technician that will positively affect health care and standards of quality in patient care by providing a safe anesthetic environment.

ASATT has the only nationally recognized certification for technicians (Cer.A.T.) and technologists (Cer.A.T.T.).

Certification
Beginning July 25, 2015, ASATT will be phasing out the technician exam (Cer.A.T.) and on-the-job training for the Anesthesia Technology profession. The certification is still valid for those who hold it.

 Approved programs will be instructing at the Technologist (Cer.A.T.T.) level and graduates will be eligible to take the
Technologist (Cer.A.T.T.) exam.
 Current Certified Technicians (Cer.A.T.) and Technologists (Cer.A.T.T.) will remain as is, as long as they maintain their certification.

Technician (Cer.A.T.)

Technologist (Cer.A.T.T.)

Publication 
The Society produces a quarterly publication known as The Sensor, which provide its readers information on anesthesia-related topics, and a forum for learning and discussion.

Accreditations and memberships
CAAHEP
NOCA

Related organizations 
American Society of Anesthesiologists
American Association of Nurse Anesthesiology
The Society for Technology in Anesthesia
Commission on Accreditation of Allied Health Education Programs

References

External links
ASATT - Official Site

Medical and health organizations based in Wisconsin
Milwaukee County, Wisconsin